Elisabeth Kirstine Frederiksen (1845–1903) was a Danish pedagogue, writer and women's activist. Thanks to study trips to the United States, she was a pioneer of visual pedagogy in Denmark, publishing Anskuelsesundervisning, Haandbog for Lærere (Visual Instruction: a Handbook for Teachers) in 1889. She was also an active contributor to the women's movement, chairing the Women Readers' Association from 1875 to 1879, and the Danish Women's Society from 1887 to 1894.

Biography
Born on 6 February 1845 in Fuglsang Manor on the Danish island of Lolland, Elisabeth Kirstine Frederiksen was the eldest daughter of the successful estate owner and farmer Johannes Ditlev Friderichsen (1791–1861) and Maria Hansen (1811–1901). She wqs the younger sister of Niels Christian Frederiksen and Erhard Frederiksen. In 1870 she travelled to London and in 1872 to Italy and Switzerland, before settling in Copenhagen where she became active in supporting women's rights, especially by heading the Women Readers' Association. When she was 33, she began to study stenography, becoming the first woman in Denmark to pass the qualifying examination in 1878. As a woman, she was however refused a position as a stenographer at the Rigsdag. In 1879, after qualifying as a teacher, she received an appointment in a state school. In addition to teaching at Frederiksberg's state school (1879–1895), from 1882 to 1844, she taught pedagogy at N. Zahle's School in Copenhagen. 

Although Frederiksen did not undertake university studies, in 1891 she received the University of Copenhagen's gold medal for her pedagogical dissertation titled De vigtigste almene Love for Opdragelsen, som lader sig udlede af den nyere Psykologi og Etik, a work which was never published. She had in fact already begun publishing in the 1880s, contributing critical articles to journals such as Vor Ungdom, and writing books on teaching methods including Anskuelsesundervisning  (1889), Barnets Sjæleliv (1890), and Amerikanske Undervisnings-Eksperimenter (1896). Thanks to study trips to the United States and Germany, she suggested that in their first years at school, children should be encouraged to learn on the basis of their sense of smell, taste, look and feel rather than on reading books.

In regard to women's rights, she chaired the Women Readers' Association from 1875 to 1879, presenting a lecture on English women's voluntary contributions to society in 1875 and trying to make the association more suited to the needs of university students. She then became one of the most effective leaders of the Danish Women's Society, chairing the organization from 1887 to 1894 when she began to suffer from serious health problems. She was also a board member of the Women's Art College, Tegne- og Kunstindustriskolen for Kvinder.

In 1903, Frederiksen travelled to the United States with her friend Augusta Fenger. On 31 August 1903, she died while staying in the Allegheny Mountains.

References

1845 births
1903 deaths
People from Guldborgsund Municipality
Danish women's rights activists
19th-century Danish educators
Danish women educators
19th-century Danish writers
19th-century Danish women writers
19th-century Danish women educators